Wolfgang M. Schmidt (born 3 October 1933) is an Austrian mathematician working in the area of number theory. He studied mathematics at the University of Vienna, where he received his PhD, which was supervised by Edmund Hlawka, in 1955. Wolfgang Schmidt is a Professor Emeritus from the University of Colorado at Boulder and a member of the Austrian Academy of Sciences and the Polish Academy of Sciences.

Career

He was awarded the eighth Frank Nelson Cole Prize in Number Theory for work on Diophantine approximation. He is known for his subspace theorem.

In 1960, he proved that every normal number in base r is normal in base s if and only if log r / log s is a rational number. He also proved the existence of T numbers. His series of papers on irregularities of distribution can be seen in J.Beck and W.Chen, Irregularities of Distribution, Cambridge University Press.
Schmidt is in a small group of number theorists who have been invited to address the International Congress of Mathematicians three times. The others are Iwaniec, Shimura, and Tate.

In 1986, Schmidt received the Humboldt Research Award and in 2003, he received the Austrian Decoration for Science and Art. Schmidt holds honorary doctorates from the University of Ulm, the Sorbonne, the University of Waterloo, the University of Marburg and the University of York. In 2012 he became a fellow of the American Mathematical Society.

Books
 Diophantine approximation. Lecture Notes in Mathematics 785. Springer. (1980 [1996 with minor corrections])
Diophantine approximations and Diophantine equations, Lecture Notes in Mathematics, Springer Verlag 2000
Equations Over Finite Fields: An Elementary Approach, 2nd edition, Kendrick Press 2004

References

Further reading
Diophantine approximation: festschrift for Wolfgang Schmidt, Wolfgang M. Schmidt, H. P. Schlickewei, Robert F. Tichy, Klaus Schmidt, Springer, 2008, 

1933 births
Living people
Number theorists
Recipients of the Austrian Decoration for Science and Art
Institute for Advanced Study visiting scholars
University of Colorado Boulder faculty
Members of the Austrian Academy of Sciences
Members of the Polish Academy of Sciences
Fellows of the American Mathematical Society